The 2015 Eastern Michigan Eagles football team represented Eastern Michigan University in the 2015 NCAA Division I FBS football season. They were led by second-year head coach Chris Creighton. The Eagles played their home games at Rynearson Stadium and were members of the West Division of the Mid-American Conference. The team finished 1–11, 0–8 in MAC play to finish in last place in the West Division.

Schedule

References

Eastern Michigan
Eastern Michigan Eagles football seasons
Eastern Michigan Eagles football